Piešťanské Čajky (officially Spoločné basketbalové združenie Piešťanské Čajky) is a Slovak women's basketball club that was founded in 2012 in the city of Piešťany. Piešťanské Čajky plays in the Slovak League, the highest competition in the Slovak Republic. It is a 1-time national champion and current champion as of 2022. On the international scene, the greatest success was the runner-up of the EWBL the 2021/22 season and the win of the CEWL in the 2018/19 season.

Since 2015, its home is Diplomat Arena. Before, the team inhabited the hall of Gymnázium Pierra de Coubertina High School in Piešťany.

Honours

Domestic
National Championships – 1
Slovak Women's Basketball Extraliga:
Winners (1) : 2022
Runner up (6) : 2015, 2016, 2017, 2019, 2020, 2021

National Cups – 1
Slovak Women's Basketball Cup:
Winners (1) : 2017
Runner up (7) : 2014, 2016, 2018, 2019, 2020, 2021, 2022

International
EWBL:
Runner up (1) : 2022
CEWL:
Winners (1) : 2019

Current squad

Notable players

  Gabriela Andělová
  Lenka Bartáková
  Kateřina Bartoňová
  Nikola Dudášová
  Mária Felixová
  Danielle Hamilton-Carter
  Anna Jurčenková
  Lucia Krč-Turbová
  Božica Mujović
  Sabína Oroszová
  Terézia Páleníková
  Angelika Slamová
  Matea Tadić
  Tamara Tatham
  Kateřina Zohnová

References

External links
Official website
Profile at eurobasket.com

Women's basketball teams in Slovakia
Basketball teams established in 2012
Piešťany District
2012 establishments in Slovakia
Sport in Trnava Region